The Australia national cricket team toured South Africa during the 1996–97 season and played a three-match Test series and a seven-match One Day International series against the South Africa national cricket team.

Australia was led in the Test series by Mark Taylor while South Africa was led by Hansie Cronje.

Australia won the Test series 2–1 and the ODI series 4–3.

Steve Waugh of Australia emerged as the top run-scorer in the Test series with 313 runs, with an average of 78.25. Jason Gillespie finished the series as top wicket-taker with 13 wickets. Steve Waugh was named "man of the Test series".

Squad 

Adam Gilchrist was brought in due to Ian Healy's suspension from the first two one-day internationals.

Test matches

1st Test

2nd Test

3rd Test

ODI series summary

1st ODI

2nd ODI

3rd ODI

4th ODI

5th ODI

6th ODI

7th ODI

References

External links
 Tour home at ESPNcricinfo
 Australia in South Africa, Feb-Apr 1997 at ESPNcricinfo archive
 
 

1997 in South African cricket
South African cricket seasons from 1970–71 to 1999–2000
1996-97
International cricket competitions from 1994–95 to 1997
1997 in Australian cricket